Pierfrancesco 'Frankie' Chili, (born 20 June 1964 in Bologna, Italy) is a former motorcycle racer who competed in the Superbike World Championship and the 250 cc and 500 cc classes in Grand Prix. In September 2020 he confirmed he was suffering from Parkinson's disease.

In World Superbike he had a record number of starts, as well as 10 poles and 17 wins. He retired at the end of the  season. Chili also won the 125cc European Championship in 1985

500 cc
Chili spent several years on a Gallina HB Honda, with some works backing. He won the 1989 Nations motorcycle Grand Prix when most of the top riders didn't race due to the track being too slippery due to rain, but was generally upper-midfield at best. His best championship finish was 6th in 1989.

250 cc
He stepped down to 250s, finishing 3rd overall in 1992.

Superbike World Championship
Curiously, in each of - he won race two at Monza after crashing in race one. In  he took two wins as well as his first two poles, coming sixth in the championship.

However, at Assen he battled too hard with Carl Fogarty (also on a factory-backed bike, although a separate team), falling on the final lap, and was sacked at the end of the year. In  he raced for Suzuki, coming sixth with two more wins. His first win came in race two at the A1-Ring, after crashing while leading the first race.

Over the next two years he made the podium just three times, coming seventh and eighth in the series. Although he was only seventh again,  represented something of a resurgence for a rider nearing forty years of age; with five third places and one win. The year  was even better for the PSG-1 Ducati team, fifth overall with another nine podiums. In  he moved to the Klaffi Honda team with rookie Max Neukirchner, coming tenth overall.  was ruined by a broken pelvis, which caused him to miss several races. Following his retirement he became team manager of the Guandalini Racing team in World Superbikes for the 2009 season

Career statistics

Grand Prix motorcycle racing

Races by year
(key) (Races in bold indicate pole position) (Races in italics indicate fastest lap)

Superbike World Championship

Races by year
(key) (Races in bold indicate pole position) (Races in italics indicate fastest lap)

References

External links

FrankieChili.com - Official site
Superbike racing statistics

1964 births
500cc World Championship riders
250cc World Championship riders
Superbike World Championship riders
Italian motorcycle racers
Living people
Sportspeople from Bologna
People with Parkinson's disease